The Skomer Volcanic Group is a Silurian lithostratigraphic group (a sequence of rock strata) in Pembrokeshire, Wales. The name is derived from the island of Skomer off the west coast of Pembrokeshire. It was traditionally known as the Skomer Volcanic Series. The rocks are exposed across the island of Skomer and along the northern half of the nearby Marloes peninsula as far east as St Ishmaels.

Lithology and stratigraphy
The Group comprises around 1000m thickness of  lava flows and associated strata including felsite, albite-trachyte, keratophyre etc laid down during the Silurian Period.

References

Silurian System
Geology of Wales